Agelasta humerata is a species of beetle in the family Cerambycidae. It was described by Stephan von Breuning in 1939. Its known species were found in the Philippines.

References

humerata
Beetles described in 1939